Steve Silver's Beach Blanket Babylon was the world's longest-running musical revue. The show began its run in 1974, at the Savoy Tivoli and later moved to the larger Club Fugazi in the North Beach district of San Francisco.

The show was created by Steve Silver (1944–1995) along with a Bar, in partnership with his father, Louis Silver, and continued since 1995 under the direction of his widow, Jo Schuman Silver, with frequent changes and spoofs of pop and political culture. Performers wear disproportionately large hats/wigs and gaudy costumes while performing satirical renditions of popular songs.

On April 17, 2019, Jo Schuman Silver announced to the staff that the show would be closing on New Year's Eve.

Plot summary 
Beach Blanket Babylon follows Snow White as she takes a fast-paced journey around the world in search of her "Prince Charming." Along the way she encounters a large group of figures from popular culture, who together perform satirical songs. Figures lampooned include politicians and political figures from the San Francisco, California and U.S. governments, film and television stars, famous singers and athletes, and others who have been in the news. Also present are long-running characters such as Glinda the Good Witch, Mr. Peanut, Louis XIV, Oprah Winfrey, James Brown, Tina Turner, Carmen Miranda, Elvis Presley, a band of dancing French Poodles, and Snow White's tour guide, a female narrator who takes on several incarnations from an Italian pizza lady to a cowgirl.

Reviews 
The show was described as "A constant cascade of showstoppers" by the San Francisco Chronicle in 2010.

Awards and accolades 
In 1996, the 600 block of Green Street, between Columbus Avenue and Powell Street, was renamed "Beach Blanket Babylon Boulevard" in honor of Steve Silver.

Final cast 

 Chave Alexander
 JM Appleby
 Curt Branom
 Amanda Cleary Blatchford
 Ruby Day
 Jacqui Heck
 Albert Hodge
 Paul Hovannes
 Renee Lubin
 Shawna Ferris McNulty
 Doug Magpiong
 Misa Malone
 Jennifer Posie Morrison
 Lizzie Moss
 Kirk Mills
 Tammy Nelson
 Brendon North
 Scott Reardon

Final production team 

 Steve Silver (Creator)
 Jo Schuman Silver (Producer, Writer)
 Kenny Mazlow (Director, Writer, Choreographer)
 Michael Anderburg (Stage Manager, Lighting Designer)
 Tom Schueneman (Sound Designer, Audio Engineer)
 Monique Motil (Costume Shop Manager, Additional Costume Design/Construction)
 Mark Reina (Assistant Director, Choreographer)
 Matthew James (Prop/Hat Construction, Technical Assistant)
 Bill Keck (Music Director/Conductor, Musical Arrangements)

Former cast and alumni 

 Jeffrey Scott Adair 1988–1989 (performer, hat maker)
Michael Benbrook, 1986–1993 (performer) – King Louis XIV
 Nancy Bleiweiss, 1974–1977 (performer) – Carmen Miranda, Opera divas, Glinda the Good Witch
 Bill Kendall, 1974-1982 (performer) - Superman, John Travolta Sat Night Fever, The Original Mr. Peanut.
Roberta Bleiweiss, 1974–1977 (performer)
 John Bush, 1980–1981 (performer)
 Hayden Hicks, 1983–1985 (performer) Mahatma Gandhi
 Robert Danielson - 1985-2005 -(Drummer)- Beach Blanket Babylon in San Francisco and London Tour
 Val Diamond, 1979–2009 (performer) – Alexis Carrington Colby, Gidget, Mahatma Gandhi, Queen Elizabeth II, Jewish mother, Marie Antoinette, French whore, "San Francisco" Finale Chanteuse
Sandy Flavin 1981-1984 Understudy to Val Diamond and Susan Parks (1981-1983) Performer 1984–1985. Was the youngest performer to be hired up to 1981.
Glenda Glayzer, 1975–1979 (performer) - AM I BLUE
Ed Goldfarb, 1995–2005 (music director)
Christopher Goodwin, 2005-2007 2011-2019 (performer) Donald Trump, Armistead Maupin, Princess Leia, Mr. Peanut
 Alan Greenspan, 1978– Hat-Maker (Finale Hats Creator/Executor, Special Effects, Props)
Brent Holland, 1984-1990 1998–2000, (performer) - King Louis XIV
Ben Jones, 2008-2009 (performer) – Elvis, George W. Bush, Bill Clinton, Michael Jackson, Michael Phelps, Arnold Schwarzenegger
  Teresa Leonard, 1980–1981 (performer)
 Chris March, 1990–2000? (costume/hat/wig designer; performer) – Elizabeth Taylor, Wonder Woman, Monica Lewinsky
 Dani Marcus (performer)- Snow White
 Anna Ty Bergman (performer) 
 Ellyn Marie Marsh, 2002–2003 (performer) – Barbra Streisand, Britney Spears, Hillary Clinton, Pineapple Princess
Stirland Martin, 1993-2004 (performer) - James Brown, Witch Doctor, French Poodle, Willie Brown, Prince, Mike Tyson, DIddy, Nutcracker
 Armistead Maupin, 1974 (writer)
  Tony Michaels, 1974 (performer) – Beach Blanket Babylon at Club Olympus
  Tony Michaels, 1975–1978 (performer) – Beach Blanket Babylon Goes Bananas!
 Skye Dee Miles 
 Shoni Mero  (performer) Hillary Clinton
 Robin Murray stage manager 1980-1988
  Jeff Robertson, 1980–1981 (performer)
  Rick Roemer, 1977–1979 (performer) – Beach Blanket Babylon Goes to the Stars!
  Jill Shutt, 1989–1992 (Val Diamond's understudy)
  Paul Thomas (director), 1974 (performer) - Beach Blanket Babylon in San Francisco 
 Ledisi Young, 1990–2001 (performer)
Richard Waits (performer)
Adam Savage (stagehand)

Tours 
Two tours were produced, in London and Las Vegas, in celebration of Beach Blanket's 20th and 25th anniversaries. The show also has a smaller touring cast that caters primarily to corporate events and parties around the world.

London:
 Val Diamond
 Doug Magpiong
 Tony Stroh
 Erica Wyman
 Dana Adkins
 Tony Tripoli
 Renee Lubin
 Cristina VanValkenburg
 Lisa Burnett Bossi
 Stirland Martin
 Kenny Mazlow
 Robert Danielson (musician)

Las Vegas:
 Jeffrey Scott Adair (performer)
 Shelley Werk (performer)
 David Reynolds (performer)
 Kenny Mazlow (performer)
 John Paul Almon (performer)
 Robin Cohen (performer)
 Patrick Reese (performer)
 Richard Pardini (performer)
 Robert Hempstead (performer)
 Janice Sands (performer)
 Joan Benson (performer)
 Stuart May (performer)
 Wanda Houston (performer)
 Sylvia MacCalla (performer)
 Holly Vonk (performer)
 Clay Adkins (performer)
 Jacqui Marshall (performer)
 Diane Ellis (performer)
 Richie Sacks (performer)

Beach Blanket Babylon, London, Restaurant
Named after the show, however not to be confused with the unrelated Beach Blanket Babylon, a London restaurant with branches in Notting Hill and Shoreditch.

References

External links 
 San Francisco Chronicle Review – 4/29/2010
Early Video
  
  
  
  
  
  

Performing groups established in 1974
1974 musicals
Cabaret
Theatre companies in San Francisco
Revues
North Beach, San Francisco